James S. (Jay) Famiglietti is the director of the Global Institute for Water Security at the University of Saskatchewan in Saskatoon, Canada. Prior to that he was the Senior Water Scientist at NASA Jet Propulsion Laboratory in Pasadena, CA and a professor of Earth System Science at the University of California, Irvine. He is a leading expert in global water issues and in raising awareness about the global water crisis and in particular, about global groundwater depletion.

Education 
Famiglietti received his B.S. in Geology from Tufts University in 1982 and his M.S. in Hydrology from the University of Arizona in 1986. He continued his graduate studies at Princeton University, where he earned both his M.A. and Ph.D. in Civil Engineering. Formerly an Assistant and Associate Professor in the Department of Geological Sciences at the University of Texas at Austin, and the founding Associate Director of the University of Texas at Austin's Environmental Science Institute, Famiglietti was also the founding director of the UC Center for Hydrologic Modeling (UCCHM) at UC Irvine.

Famiglietti is known for his research using satellites and developing computer models to track changing freshwater availability around the globe. His work, his commentary and efforts in science communication were featured in the Participant Media water documentary Last Call at the Oasis, in 60 Minutes, on Real Time with Bill Maher.

Research and Projects 
Famiglietti's research centers around “the role of hydrology in the coupled Earth system” and evaluating “global change impacts on water availability.” He has long been a proponent of advancing the capabilities of hydrological models in the United States. While chair of the board of the Consortium of Universities for the Advancement of Hydrologic Science (CUAHSI), he led the Community Hydrologic Modeling Platform (CHyMP) effort to accelerate the development of hydrological models for use in addressing global issues related to water, food, economic, climate, and global security.  He continued those efforts at the UCCHM and at NASA JPL, where he leads the Western States Water Mission.

Famiglietti conducts research using NASA’s Gravity Recovery and Climate Experiment (GRACE) to monitor how humans and global change are impacting freshwater availability. His team pioneered the use of GRACE for remote sensing of groundwater storage changes. Their work has revealed unsustainable groundwater use and the rapid rates of groundwater depletion in the world's major aquifers. This research is also recognized by NASA as the primary justification for the selection of the GRACE Follow-On (GRACE-FO) as a climate continuation mission.

Awards and honors 
Famiglietti is a Fellow of the American Geophysical Union (AGU) and of the Geological Society of America (GSA). In 2012 he was selected as the GSA's Birdsall-Dreiss Distinguished Lecturer.  During that year he delivered over 50 lectures in the United States and internationally on the topics of water cycle change and on the need to advance hydrological modelling capabilities. He was also selected as one of two 2014 David Keith Todd Lecturers of the Groundwater Resources Association of California.  In 2010, Famiglietti was the recipient of the Shimizu Visiting Professorship at Stanford University in Civil and Environmental Engineering. Other notable honors include being awarded the Outstanding Contributions to Undergraduate Education honor in 2005 by UC Irvine, and the NASA New Investigator Award in 1996.

Publications 
Famiglietti has published a number of academic research reports and articles, on topics ranging from soil moisture, to the remote sensing of groundwater availability and the effects of climate change on water balance. Notable publications include Satellite-Based Estimates of Groundwater Depletion in India, Satellites Measure Recent Rates of Groundwater Depletion in California’s Central Valley (2011),  The Global Groundwater Crisis (2014), Quantifying Renewable Groundwater Stress with GRACE and Emerging trends in global freshwater availability

Beyond academia, Famiglietti has published a number of op-eds in major national newspapers including the Los Angeles Times, and the San Francisco Chronicle. Among these, his March 12, 2015 LA Times op-ed went viral and attracted major media and public attention He has also been a regular contributor to the National Geographic Water Currents blog and to Huffington Post.

References

External links
H2O:The Molecule That Made Us PBS.org documentary with Famiglietti

Year of birth missing (living people)
Living people
University of California, Irvine faculty
American hydrologists